The Macedonian Journal of Medical Sciences (print: ,) is an open-access peer-reviewed medical journal published quarterly by the Institute of Immunobiology and Human Genetics (Faculty of Medicine, Ss. Cyril and Methodius University of Skopje) since 2008.

Abstracting and indexing 
The journal is abstracted and indexed in CAB Direct/Global Health database, EBSCO databases, EMBASE, and Scopus.

See also
Open Access Scholarly Publishers Association, of which MJMS is a member

External links 
 
 Institute of Immunobiology and Human Genetics, Skopje University

General medical journals
Publications established in 2008
English-language journals
Quarterly journals
Open access journals
Ss. Cyril and Methodius University of Skopje
2008 establishments in the Republic of Macedonia